Picón is a municipality in Ciudad Real, Castile-La Mancha, Spain. It has a population of 661. It was also a province in New Spain

Picón is also the name of blue cheeses made around the Asturias/Cantabria border in northern Spain, especially from the villages of Bejes and Tresviso.  See: .

And a type of traditional parang music.

Municipalities in the Province of Ciudad Real